Man Wai-hung, known professionally as Jazz Boon (born 25 September 1966), is a Hong Kong television producer, director, and writer. His professional TV career started in the early 1990s, when he was hired by TVB as a production assistant. His first drama as director was the 1995 police procedural Invincible Vanguard. He was promoted to producer in 2012.

Boon's television dramas have received commercial and critical acclaim. His credits include Bounty Lady, the Line Walker series, and A Fist Within Four Walls.

Filmography

Drama series

Theatrical releases

References

External links
 

Hong Kong film directors
Hong Kong screenwriters
TVB producers
Living people
Hong Kong people
Year of birth missing (living people)